Cornélie Barbe Hyacinthe Jacquemart, known as Nélie (25 July 1841– 15 May 1912) was a French painter, art collector and patron of the arts.

Biography
She was born in Paris. Her mother, Marie, may have been a milliner and her father appears to have died shortly after her birth. Much is uncertain, as she later destroyed many early documents, to conceal her plebeian origins.

When she displayed an early talent for art, she became a protégée of De Vatry's wife, and spent summers at their hunting lodge in the former Chaalis Abbey. There, she developed her drawing skills and met many prominent figures who had been involved in the Bourbon Restoration. Thanks to Mme. de Vatry, she was able to study in the workshop of Léon Cogniet, a Professor at the École nationale supérieure des beaux-arts, which did not accept female students at that time. The lessons were given by Cogniet's sister, Marie-Amélie, and consisted largely of copying Cogniet's works.

Her first public exposure came from an unusual source. In 1858, Malka Kachwar, the Queen of Oudh, died in Paris on her way home from London. She was buried with great ceremony at Père-Lachaise. Jacquemart was there, with Léon Cogniet, and created numerous sketches of the event. An editor at L'Illustration named Aristide Merille had them made into lithographs by Évremond de Bérard and Jules Worms and published them in the magazine later that year.

Her first showing at the Salon came in 1863 when she was only twenty-two. She received several commissions as a result. At the Salon of 1866, one of her works was purchased by the government and was on display at the Palais des Tuileries until it and the building were destroyed during the Commune. In 1867, she was able to travel to Italy, where she studied with Ernest Hébert, Director of the Académie de France à Rome. While she was there, she befriended Geneviève Bréton, a relative of Louis Hachette, who kept a detailed diary that sheds light on Jacquemart's character and activities. Through Bréton, she met the writer , son of the Minister of Education, Victor Duruy, whose portrait she painted. After that, according to Bréton, she thought of little but getting married. Her portrait of Duruy was awarded a medal at the Salon of 1870.

Art collector
Shortly after, the Franco-Prussian War began. Among its victims was her friend, the painter Henri Regnault, who died defending Paris. She continued to paint, however. After the war, she was commissioned to do a portrait of President Adolphe Thiers. She also did a portrait of the art collector, Édouard André. Nine years later, she married him, although there is no evidence to indicate they had a relationship. He was ill at the time and his family insisted on a marriage contract that established a complete separation of their respective personal properties. Despite this arrangement. their collections, both begun many years before, began to merge. Eventually, she decided to hyphenate her name as Jacquemart-André. 

The couple travelled throughout Europe, Egypt and Turkey, adding to their collection. Altogether, they acquired 207 sculptures and 97 paintings. They were particularly interested in Italian Renaissance art and caused a scandal when they bought frescoes by Tiepolo at the Palazzo Contarini-Pisani, near Padua. There was a vitriolic attack in the press and many called for a ban on removing them from Italy. Nevertheless, the frescoes were removed and are now in the couple's townhouse (now the Musée Jacquemart-André) on the Boulevard Haussmann.

After Édouard's death in 1894, she produced a copy of a document giving her possession of the entire joint collection. His family disputed its authenticity, but she won the case. After taking possession, she expanded the collection to include medals and English paintings. In 1902, she discovered that Mme.de Vatry's estate had been sold, including Chaalis Abbey. Luckily, she was able to acquire the Abbey and housed part of her collection there. She also ordered a funerary monument, showing her with palette and brush in hand, although she had painted very little in almost thirty years.

She died in 1912, at her home on the Boulevard Haussmann in Paris. She was interred in the chapel at the Abbey, adorned with frescoes by Francesco Primaticcio. In accordance with an agreement she had made with Édouard, all of her possessions were bequeathed to the Institut de France. One year later, two Musées Jacquemart-André were inaugurated and opened to the public; one in Paris and one at the Abbey.

References

Further reading 
Théodore Pelloquet, "Nélie Jacquemart : Molière chez le barbier Gely, à Pézenas", L'Exposition, journal du salon de 1863, 24 May 1863, online
Gustave Vapereau, Dictionnaire universel des contemporains: contenant toutes les personnes notables de la France et des pays étrangers, L. Hachette (1880) Chapter on Jacquemart online
Sandrine Herman, "Étude de la correspondance de Nélie Jacquemart-Andre 1881-1912", Université Paris-Sorbonne (1993-1995)
Anne-Marie Bautier and Robert-Henri Bautier, "Nélie Jacquemart-André, artiste, collectionneuse, mécène ou la passion de l’œuvre d’art", Gazette des beaux-arts, February 1995, pgs.79-114
Jean-Pierre Babelon, Une passion commune pour l'art, Nélie Jacquemart et Édouard André, Scala (2012) online
Charles Duprat and C. Recoura, Entrez dans l'univers du Musée Jacquemart-André, Fondation Culturespaces, Dossier pédagogique, online

External links 

.
.
.
.

1841 births
1912 deaths
19th-century French painters
20th-century French painters
French art collectors
Women art collectors
Museum founders
French women painters